The Journal of Applied Behavioral Science is a quarterly peer-reviewed academic journal covering the psychology of groups and organizations. Its editor-in-chief is Gavin Schwarz (University of New South Wales). It was established 1965 and is published by SAGE Publications in association with the National Training Laboratories.

Abstracting and indexing
The journal is abstracted and indexed in Scopus and the Social Sciences Citation Index. According to the Journal Citation Reports, its 2020 impact factor is 2.325.

References

External links

 

SAGE Publishing academic journals
English-language journals
Publications established in 1965
Psychology journals
Quarterly journals